Quincy Treffers (born February 4, 1991 in Den Helder, Netherlands) is a former Dutch basketball player. He played for Dutch Basketball League clubs Bergen op Zoom, Den Helder, Weert and Aris Leeuwarden.

Honours
Individual
U23 All-Star Game MVP (1): 2014

References

External links
eurobasket.com profile

Dutch men's basketball players
People from Den Helder
1991 births
Dutch Basketball League players
Aris Leeuwarden players
Living people
Den Helder Kings players
BSW (basketball club) players
West-Brabant Giants players
Centers (basketball)
Power forwards (basketball)